Maadhu Balaji, born as Balaji, is an Indian actor and comedian known for his roles in Tamil theatre plays and Tamil television serials.

Balaji has acted in a number of stage plays and films. He is the brother of the late ace humorist and playwright Crazy Mohan. He gave himself the prefix "Maadhu" after Nagesh's name in Ethir Neechal (1968).

Balaji graduated from the Vivekananda College, Madras University in Chennai. His stage career started during his college days where he started acting in a number of stage plays and dramas and was touted as a prospective stage and film actor.

With Crazy Mohan and close friends, Maadhu Balaji established Crazy Creations in 1979, one of the leading drama troupes in Tamil stage today, with an impeccable history of 15 launches and over 5000 shows all around the globe.

Balaji acts as Maadhu, the lead role in all these dramas and has the amazing track record of not missing even one of these shows.

Theatre 
Some of popular Tamil dramas as an actor are listed below.

 Maadhu +2
 Jurassic Baby
 Marriage Made in Saloon
 Meesai Aanaalum Manaivi
 Alaavudeenum 100 Watts Bulbum
 Crazy Kishkintha
 Return of Crazy Thieves
 Oru Babiyin Diary Kurippu
 Kathalikka Maadhu Undu
 Maadhu Mirandal
 Madhil Mel Maadhu
 Chocolate Krishna
 Satellite Saamiyaar
 Oru Sontha Veedu Vaadagai Veedagirathu
 Ayya Amma Ammamma
 Google Gadothgajan
 Crazy Premier League (CPL)
 Gummaala Gokulam (Upcoming Drama)
•  Siri Siri Crazy

Films 
Though the majority of his work has been related to stage dramas, Maadhu Balaji has also done roles in films like:
 Jerry (2006)
 Poovellam Kettuppar (1999)
 Chinna Chinna Aasaigal (1989)

Television serials 
Maadhu Balaji has acted as hero in several popular Television serials including:
 Nine TV Serials of Crazy Mohan directed by S. B. Khanthan
 Flight 172 and Sundaram & Sons of T. S. B. K. Moulee
 Chinna Mani-Peria Mani of Y. G. Mahendran
 Penn of Suhaasini
 Chaaru Latha – Written and Directed by S. B. Khanthan
 Siri-ga-ma-pa-da-ni" ran 108 successful weeks, produced by GDR Communications and written by Crazy Mohan
 Nil Gavani Crazy, directed by S. B. Khanthan and written by Crazy Mohan, 66 episodes on Jaya TV
 Aachi International of AVM
 Siri Siri Crazy (2016) Crazy Times Vidathu Sirippu (2004) 
 Here is Crazy Maadhu Cheenu Nil Gavani Crazy (Sun TV)
 Siri Gama Padhani Crazy Times (Vijay TV)
 Penn''

References 

Tamil male actors
Living people
Actors in Tamil theatre
Indian male film actors
Male actors in Tamil cinema
Indian male comedians
Tamil comedians
Indian male dramatists and playwrights
Year of birth missing (living people)
21st-century Indian actors